Ecuador competed at the 1996 Summer Olympics in Atlanta, United States, winning its first Olympic medal when Jefferson Pérez won the gold medal in the men's 20 km walk.

Medalists

Gold
 Jefferson Pérez — Athletics, Men's 20 km Walk

Results by event

Athletics
Men's 10,000 metres
 Silvio Guerra

Men's Marathon
 Rolando Vera — 2:17.40 (→ 22nd place)

Men's 20 km Walk
 Jefferson Pérez — 1:20.07 (→   Gold Medal)

Women's Marathon
 Martha Tenorio — did not finish (→ no ranking)

Boxing
Men's Welterweight (– 67 kg)
Luis Hernández
 First Round — Lost to Kabil Lahsen (Morocco), 9-18

Men's Heavyweight (– 91 kg)
Thompson García
 First Round — Lost to Georgi Kandelaki (Georgia), abandoned

Cycling
 Paulo Caicedo
 Pedro Rodríguez
 Héctor Chiles

Sailing
 Gastón Vedani

Shooting
 Margarita de Falconí

Swimming
Men's 50m Freestyle
 Felipe Delgado
 Heat – 23.26 (→ did not advance, 25th place)

Men's 100m Freestyle
 Felipe Delgado
 Heat – 51.38 (→ did not advance, 38th place)

Men's 100m Butterfly
 Roberto Delgado
 Heat – 56.29 (→ did not advance, 44th place)

Men's 200m Butterfly
 Andrés Vasconcellos
 Heat – 2:05.98 (→ did not advance, 39th place)

Men's 4 × 100 m Freestyle
 Julio Santos, Felipe Delgado, Roberto Delgado, and Javier Santos 
 Heat – 3:27.77 (→ did not advance, 15th place)

Men's 4 × 200 m Freestyle
 Roberto Delgado, Julio Santos, Javier Santos, and Andrés Vasconcellos 
 Heat – 7:54.37 (→ did not advance, 16th place)

Tennis
Men's Singles Competition
 Luis Morejón 
 First round — Defeated Marcelo Filippini (Uruguay) 6-7 7-5 6-1
 Second round — Lost to Renzo Furlan (Italy) 5-7 2-6
 Nicolás Lapentti 
 First round — Lost to Andrei Olhovskiy (Russia) 1-6 6-3 6-8
 Pablo Campana

See also
 Ecuador at the 1995 Pan American Games
 Ecuador at the Olympics

References
Ecuador Olympic Committee
sports-reference

Nations at the 1996 Summer Olympics
1996 Summer Olympics
Olympics